In the hot dry summer of 2003, a fire began to burn in the North Thompson Valley which destroyed numerous homes and businesses. This wildfire started when Mike Barre threw his cigarette butt into the grass on his property in McLure BC.   The fire resulted in the loss of 72 houses, 9 businesses, and 180 jobs in the North Thompson Valley.  The fire cost $31.1 million CAD to extinguish and caused an additional $8.2 million CAD in property damage.  Provincial court Judge Sundhu sentenced Mike Barre to pay a $3000 CAD fine.  Barre could have been sentenced to a $1-million fine and as much as three years in prison.

Timeline

July 30, 2003 
On Wednesday, July 30, 2003, the careless discarding of a cigarette butt by McLure resident Mike Barre, into dry pine needles and withered grass, began a nightmare for those who lived in the North Thompson Valley.  The fire was reported to the BC Forest Service at 1:02 p.m.  Crews and airtankers were dispatched within 22 minutes. Machinery followed within the second half hour. The fire spread up the hill, grew from half a hectare to six hectares in under an hour and three-quarters, and challenged the retardant lines.  Within the next 15 minutes, the fire was reported at 10 to 12 hectares, and showed signs of rapid growth.  Airtankers continued to work until nightfall. Resources on the fire for that day reported; airtankers dropped a total of 400,000 litres of retardant, 87 firefighters were on site, four helicopters, five bulldozers, two excavators, and three water trucks working with the McLure Fire Department. At the end of the day the fire size was estimated at 195 hectares.

July 31, 2003 
The following day, Thursday, July 31, crews, air tankers, helicopters and heavy equipment worked the fire to establish and reinforce control lines. By 7 p.m., the fire started to move downhill toward Highway 5.  Fire behaviour at this point was Rank 6, with trees fully engulfed in flames from the base to the tip and fire balls forming above the tree tops. 44 km/ hour  winds fanned the flames with gusts up to 60 km/h. The temperature was 34° degrees.  At 9:30 p.m., the fire jumped the North Thompson River from east to west.  Throughout the night the fire on both sides of the river continued to be very volatile, and all resources were committed to protecting structures. Resources on the fire on July 31 were; 100 firefighters, four helicopters, nine bulldozers, two excavators,  and five water trucks with the McLure and Barriere Fire Departments.

August 1, 2003 

By Friday, Aug. 1 the fire became extremely active on both sides of the North Thompson River in the afternoon. Equipment and crews were pulled back from the fire line to ensure their safety.  An excavator on the west side of the river was abandoned and the operator evacuated by helicopter.  Equipment and crews were pulled back from the fire line to ensure their safety.  By 2:30 p.m., some structures were already lost. The Rank 6 fire became a firestorm by creating its own wind, pulling in more oxygen and burning hotter. Trees were twisted by the winds.  By 3 p.m., helicopters could no longer work the fire due to heat and wind.  Ground crews continued to work the fire with fire engines and water trucks.  At about 4 p.m., the fire jumped the North Thompson river from west to east, and resulting in thes the Tolko – Louis Creek sawmill being set on fire. The heat of the mill burning pulled the east fire off the ridge and down into the river bottom. At about 5:30 p.m., the Tolko mill manager ordered firefighters out, due to two one-million liter tanks of propane on site. Crews were pulled back to Barriere to establish a line of defense, but those lines were overrun before they were completed. The fire on both the east and west side of the river moved fast, with an estimated rate of spread of 80 meters per minute.  The fire was now over 8,000 hectares and had travelled to the Bonaparte Plateau, threatening to run all the way to Little Fort which was also evacuated.

August 5, 2003 
By August 5, the fire no longer was a threat to Barriere and its adjacent communities, however, hot spots continued to flare-up throughout the path of its initial destruction.

August 8, 2003 
The evacuation order was lifted on August 8.

August 31, 2003 
The fire was not officially declared contained until August 31.

Resources 
The Barriere, McLure, Chu Chua, and Clearwater Volunteer Fire Departments, along with the Ministry of Forests initially fought the fire.  Due to the voracity of the flames, the speed of the fire's growth, and the threat to human life and property, numerous other fire departments from throughout British Columbia and Alberta responded to the emergency and arrived to help. Air support included nine bird dogs, four water bombers, 24 air tankers, and 12 helicopters.  People and heavy machinery arrived constantly to lend assistance. They were followed by 400 members of the Canadian Military who set up camp at the Fall Fair Grounds in Barriere.  The camp later grew to 800.

Fire Departments that took part included:  McLure, Barriere, Chu Chua, Clearwater, Buckhorn, Bear Lake, Williams Lake, Beaverly, Pine View, Red Rock/Stoner, McBride, Ferndale/Tabor, View Royal, Pilot Mountain, Abbotsford, Mill Bay, Mission, Langley Township, Maple Ridge, Campbell River, Shawnigan Lake, Keremeos, Lower Nicola, Sicamous, Central Saanich, Chilliwack, Langley City, Surrey, Grand Forks City, Nanaimo, Ness Lake, Quintech (Alberta), Nicholson, Whistler, Vernon, Kelowna, Nelson, Cowichan Bay, Fort St. John, White Rock, Port Coquitlam, Sechelt, Howe Sound, Gibsons, North Okanagan Regional District, and Cominco.

Loss and Damages 
The McLure fire caused the devastating loss or damage of 72 homes and 9 businesses in the Lower North Thompson Valley.  Due to this fire, 3,800 people were evacuated (880 of these people were also evacuated for a  second time) from the small  communities of McLure, Exlou, Barriere and Louis Creek.  The fire reached a final size of 26,420 hectares.

Casualties 
During the McLure Wildfire two air tanker crew members and a helicopter pilot lost their lives while fighting the fires in British Columbia:  Ian MacKay, Eric Ebert, and Bernhard Georg Freiherr “Ben” von Hardenberg.

Aftermath 
People gathered in the communities of McLure, Exlou, Louis Creek, and Barriere to assist in the rebuilding process.  Donations were received from as far away as Australia, and the United Kingdom.  An overwhelming amount of help, compassion, and generosity was extended to the residents of these impacted communities.  Although all the names of those who came to help are not known, the results of their labours are still visible today – rebuilt homes, rebuilt lives, and rebuilt future

 The North Thompson Relief Fund, formed by Kamloops businessman George Evans, became a registered society on August 2, 2003, and immediately started to receive cash donations to help in the fire relief effort.  By September 20, 2003, $1,800,000 had been contributed and the donations continued to grow.
 BC Quilting set a goal to put a quilt on every bed lost, they received 840 quilts in response.
 The Canadian Red Cross came to the Valley and stayed until April 2004.  They administered to all those impacted – providing shelter, living necessities, and mental health support.  The Red Cross also provided funding  that had been earmarked for the area, to establish the North Thompson Volunteer and Information Centre in Barriere.
 The Salvation Army was on site in Barriere and Louis Creek almost immediately after the fire had moved on.  They arrived with their mobile kitchens, and provided three meals a day for anyone impacted by the fire.  They also opened a depot in Barriere for a number of months that was stocked to overflowing with a myriad of items donated for area families impacted by the fire.
 BC Hydro crews replaced over 20 km of transmission line and more than 100 poles in just under three weeks, at an approximate cost of $6.2 million.
 TELUS had 50 to 60 workers replacing damaged poles and over 100 km of cable.  It took them just over five weeks to repair the damage.
 Numerous Christian organizations, such as the Mennonite Disaster Service, arrived in the communities of Barriere and Louis Creek to offer spiritual and physical support, while rebuilding homes lost to the fire.
 The Kamloops SPCA, the Department of Agriculture, and other humane organizations cared for animals both large and small during the evacuations and the aftermath.
 The Barriere and District Food Bank exceeded even their own expectations.  Due to a phenomenal outpouring of donations, and a large number of volunteers, the Food Bank – working in conjunction with the Canadian Red Cross – cared for those who had lost employment, those who lost their homes, and all those in need.

The Wildfire Dragon Monument 

The McLure Wildfire Monument Society created the Wildfire Dragon Monument site and Spirit Square, (situated just off Highway 5 in Louis Creek), to permanently recognize all those who fought in the fire, helped in the aftermath, and joined hands to rebuild.  Funding for the site came from generous donations that were given to mark the events surrounding the wildfire, being and important historical moment in time for the North Thompson Valley.  The site is dedicated to all of the firefighters, volunteers, individuals, churches, service groups, businesses, organizations, and government bodies – those who admirably displayed what the human spirit can accomplish when everyone works together.  The site is well worth the time to stop and learn, stroll around the tranquil landscape, and gaze upon the face of the dragon.

References

External links
McLure Fire remembered, CBC News (2015).
Video: Barriere B.C. thriving 15 years after the McLure fire, CBC News (2018).

2003 07 30
Natural disasters in British Columbia
2003 in British Columbia
2003 wildfires
2003 disasters in Canada